Prince Mangkra Souvanna Phouma of the Kingdom of Laos (born 1938) is the son of Prince Souvanna Phouma.

Biography

Since 1975, he has been living in exile in Paris, France. He is married to Tiao Oanna Rangsi and they have four children.

Prince Mangkra Souvannaphouma is Founder and President of the Laos Committee for the Defense of Laws and People, which aims to remove the current government of Laos and establish a constitutional monarchy. He works along with other members of the Laos Royal Family such as Prince Sauryavong Savang, Crown Prince Soulivong Savang and Prince Thayavong Savang to establish a Constitutional Monarchy in Laos.
Prince Mangkra Souvannaphouma also serves as a member of the Council of Regency of Laos. He believes that the Lao Royal family can provide for his   people social and economic change to unify the people for a peaceful solution to all problems in Laos.

Awards
Mangkra Souvannaphouma has also received such awards as Commander of the Order of Social Merit and Knight of the Grand Order of the Legion of Honour, both of France.

External links
Prince Mangkra Souvannaphouma (French)
Prince Mangkra Souvannaphouma speaking at the Parliament of the Representatives of Lao from abroad
Photos of Prince Mangkra Souvannaphouma at the Association of France and Thailand & Laos
Prince Mangkra Souvannaphouma established the laosnet server at the Athenaeum of Beaune
As a worthy organizer of the Saint Vincent (festival) in 1995, the village of Chorey-les-Beaune benefitted from the occasion to include Laotians in the popular festivities by accommodating a prestigious host, His Highness Prince Mangkra Souvannaphouma of Laos

1938 births
Living people
Laotian royalty
Chevaliers of the Légion d'honneur
Laotian people of French descent